Daniel Clarke Doubiago (born September 25, 1960) is a former American football offensive tackle who played one season for the Kansas City Chiefs in 1987 as a replacement player. He also played two seasons in the USFL.

Early life
Doubiago was born on September 25, 1960 in Escondido, California. He went to high school at Mendocino (CA).

College career
He played college football at Utah, where he was a tight end. In 1979 he had one catch for nine yards. In 1980 he had three catches for 47 yards and two touchdowns.

Professional career

Pittsburgh Maulers
In 1984 he played for the Pittsburgh Maulers of the USFL. He played in 14 games and started 5 of them.

Los Angeles Express
In 1985 he played for the Los Angeles Express of the USFL.

Orlando Renegades
He also played for the Orlando Renegades in 1985.

Kansas City Chiefs
He played three games with the Kansas City Chiefs in 1987 as a replacement player. In the three games that he played in, the Chiefs were outscored by 69. He played in week 4, 5 and 6. He did not play in any games afterwards.

Personal life
In October of 1987, he was arrested with one other Chiefs player for causing a disturbance at a bar. Doubiago allegedly punched the manager in the face.

References

Further reading

Living people
1960 births
American football offensive tackles
Utah Utes football players
Pittsburgh Maulers players
Los Angeles Express players
Kansas City Chiefs players
Players of American football from California
Sportspeople from Escondido, California